Kahu (also Romanized as Kāhū) is a village in Takab Rural District, in the Central District of Dargaz County, Razavi Khorasan Province, Iran. At the 2006 census, its population was 639, in 186 families.

References 

Populated places in Dargaz County